Tara Jane Westover (born September 27, 1986) is an American memoirist, essayist and historian. Her memoir Educated (2018) debuted at No. 1 on The New York Times bestseller list and was a finalist for a number of national awards, including the LA Times Book Prize, PEN America's Jean Stein Book Award, and two awards from the National Book Critics Circle Award. The New York Times ranked Educated as one of the 10 Best Books of 2018. Westover was chosen by Time magazine as one of the 100 most influential people of 2019.

Early life and education 
Westover was the youngest of seven children born in Clifton, Idaho (population 259) to Mormon survivalist parents. She has five older brothers and an older sister. Her parents were suspicious of doctors, hospitals, public schools, and the federal government. Westover was born at home, delivered by a midwife, and was never taken to a doctor or nurse. She was not registered for a birth certificate until she was nine years old. Their father resisted getting formal medical treatment for any of the family. Even when seriously injured, the children were treated only by their mother, who had studied herbalism and other methods of alternative healing.

All the siblings were loosely homeschooled by their mother. Westover has said an older brother taught her to read, and she studied the scriptures of the Church of Jesus Christ of Latter-day Saints. But she never attended a lecture, wrote an essay, or took an exam. There were few textbooks in their house.

As a teenager, Westover began to want to enter the larger world and attend college. She purchased textbooks and studied independently in order to score well on the ACT Exam. She gained admission to Brigham Young University and was awarded a scholarship, although she had no high school diploma. After a difficult first year, in which Westover struggled to adjust to academia and the wider society there, she became more successful and graduated with honors in 2008.

She then earned a Master's degree from the University of Cambridge at Trinity College as a Gates Cambridge Scholar, and was a visiting fellow at Harvard University in 2010. She returned to Trinity College, Cambridge, where she earned a doctorate in intellectual history in 2014. Her thesis is entitled "The Family, Morality and Social Science in Anglo-American Cooperative Thought, 1813–1890".

In 2009, while a graduate student at Cambridge, Westover told her parents that for many years (since age 15), she had been physically and psychologically abused by an older brother. Her parents denied her account and suggested that Westover was under the influence of Satan. The family split over these events. Westover wrote about the estrangement, and her unusual path to and through university education in her 2018 memoir, Educated.

Career
Westover was Fall 2019 A.M. Rosenthal Writer in Residence at the Shorenstein Center at Harvard Kennedy School. She was selected as a Senior Research Fellow at Harvard Kennedy School at Harvard University for Spring 2020.

Westover has written for The New York Times and BBC News.<ref name="bbc/53078330">{{cite news |last1=Westover |first1=Tara |title=Rethink: Tara Westover says Build a world where we can be one people' |url=https://www.bbc.com/news/world-53078330 |access-date=9 November 2022 |work=BBC News |date=24 June 2020}}</ref>

Works
Educated: A Memoir

In 2018, Penguin Random House published Westover's Educated: A Memoir, which tells the story of her struggle to reconcile her desire for education and autonomy with her family's rigid ideology and isolated life. The coming-of-age story was a No. 1 New York Times bestseller, and was positively reviewed by the New York Times, The Atlantic Monthly, USA Today, Vogue, and The Economist, among others.

, Educated has spent two years in hardcover on the New York Times bestseller list and is being translated into 45 languages. The book was voted the No. 1 Library Reads pick by American librarians, and in August 2019, it had been checked out more frequently than any other book through all New York Public Library's 88 branches. As of December 2020, Educated has sold more than 8 million copies.

Through their attorney, the family has disputed some elements of Westover's book, including her suggestion that her father may have bipolar disorder and that her mother may have suffered a brain injury that resulted in reduced motor skills.

 Awards and recognition 
Westover's book earned her several awards, and other recognition. 

 Named the Book of the Year by the American Booksellers Association
 Finalist for the John Leonard Prize from the National Book Critics Circle
 Finalist for the Autobiography Award from the National Book Critics Circle
 Finalist for the LA Times Book Prize in Biography
 Finalist for PEN/America's Jean Stein Award
 Finalist for the American Booksellers Association Audiobook of the Year Award
 Finalist for Barnes & Noble's Discover Great Writers Award
 One of the New York Times' 10 Best Books of 2018
 Long-listed for the Carnegie Medal of Excellence
 Winner of the Goodreads Choice Award for Autobiography
 Winner of the Audie Award for Autobiography/Memoir
 Alex Award from the American Library Association
 Named an 'Amazing Audiobook for Young Adults' by the American Library Association
 Amazon Editors' pick for the Best Book of 2018
 Apple's Best Memoir of the Year
 Audible's Best Memoir of the Year
 Hudson Group Best Book of the Year
 President Barack Obama's pick for summer reading and his Favorite Books of the Year list
 Bill Gates's Holiday Reading list
 Westover chosen by Time Magazine as one of the 100 most influential people of 2019
 Educated named one of the Best Books of the year by The Washington Post, Oprah Magazine, Time, NPR, Good Morning America, The San Francisco Chronicle, The Guardian, The Economist, The Financial Times, The New York Post, The Skimm, Bloomberg, Real Simple, Town & Country, Bustle, Publishers Weekly, The Library Journal, Book Riot, and the New York Public Library.
 Featured speaker, Seattle Arts & Lectures, 2019 
 New York Historical Society Women in Public Life Award
 James Joyce Award
 Evans Handcart Award

 Personal life 
Westover lives in London.

References

External links

Tara Westover, After Words,'' C-SPAN

21st-century American memoirists
American women memoirists
21st-century American women writers
21st-century American historians
American women historians
Survivalism in the United States
Alumni of Trinity College, Cambridge
Brigham Young University alumni
Writers from Idaho
1986 births
Living people